Krn is a mountain of the southwestern Julian Alps in northwestern Slovenia. It is the highest mountain of the Krn Mountains. Krn has a mighty western wall, which can be best seen from Kobarid or Drežnica.

On the southern slope of the mountain lie the small villages of Vrsno, Krn, Drežnica, Drežniške Ravne, and Magozd. On the northern side lies Lake Krn, the largest glacial lake in Slovenia.

During the First World War, the Battles of the Isonzo took place in the area. The 3rd Regiment of Alpini had taken Mount Krn's peak on 16 June 1915 in a daring raid where the elite Italian unit climbed the peak's cliffs "with their boots swaddled in sacks of straw to reduce noise," some of them barefoot, and others wearing only socks, and battled the Hungarian battalion of the 4th Honved Regiment.  "It was a glorious success, the first of the war, presaging others that never materialized."

The top of neighbouring Mount Batognica was blown off by an accidental weapon depot explosion. Many remnants from the war remain scattered around the peak.

Lodges
 On the southern side near the top is the Gomišček Krn Lodge;
 On the northern side near the lake stands the Krn Lakes Lodge;
 On the Kuhinja Pasture stands the Kuhinja Pasture Lodge;
 Below its northern slope, in Lepena, stands the Dr. Klement Jug Lepena Lodge.

Access to the summit
 3 hours from Kuhinja Pasture
 5 hours from Dr. Klement Jug Lepena Lodge
 5 hours from Drežnica, via the Silvo Koren Route
 7¾ hours from the Savica Lodge over the Prehodavci Pass

Bibliography 
Notes

References 

 - Total pages: 409 
 - Total pages: 496

Literature
 Planinski vodnik Julijske Alpe, PZS, 2003, 
 Andrej Stritar, Vodnik Julijske Alpe - Gore nad Sočo, 1997,

External links 
 
 Krn on Geopedia.si
 Krn on Hribi.net Routes and photos
 Virtual panoramas. Burger.si
 Krn on Facebook
 SummitPost: Krn

Mountains of the Julian Alps
Triglav National Park
Two-thousanders of Slovenia